Czesław Boguszewicz (born 2 July 1950) is a Polish retired football and later manager.

Career

At the age of 16, Boguszewicz trained with Pogoń Szczecin in the Polish top flight and debuted at the age of 17. Just before the 1978 FIFA World Cup, he suffered an eye injury, causing him to miss the squad and retire from professional football.

While playing, Boguszewicz obtained his coaching badges, causing him to be appointed head coach of Arka Gydnia at the age of 28, where he won that season's Polish Cup. After vacationing in Finland, Boguszewicz played and coached there, where the season lasted from spring to autumn and the attendances were low.

From Finland, he was appointed head coach of Nigerian side Nigerdock, where he experienced corruption and was stoned by opposing fans during 1 occasion.

References

External links
 

1950 births
Living people
Polish footballers
Poland international footballers
Polish football managers
Association football defenders
Gryf Słupsk players
Pogoń Szczecin players
Arka Gdynia players
Mikkelin Palloilijat players
Reipas Lahti players
Ekstraklasa players
Polish expatriate footballers
Expatriate footballers in Finland
Polish expatriate sportspeople in Finland
Arka Gdynia managers
People from Słupsk